Mungy is a rural locality in the North Burnett Region, Queensland, Australia.

Geography
Gin Gin–Mount Perry–Monto Road runs through from east to north-west.

References 

North Burnett Region
Localities in Queensland